The Bon Marche Department Store (also known as the Bon Marche Building and the Macy's Building) is a building in Seattle listed on the National Register of Historic Places.

History

The building was designed by John Graham, Sr. Construction began in February 1928 and the store opened in August 1929. The building served as The Bon Marché's flagship store and was later operated by Macy's. Macy's sold the upper 6 levels of the flagship store in 2015 to Starwood Capital. That portion of the building was remodeled into a  office complex for Amazon.com. Macy's remained on the lower two floors and in the basement. On February 23, 2020, the Macy's closed the store and the building was sold to Starwood.

See also
 National Register of Historic Places listings in Seattle

References

External links
 

1929 establishments in Washington (state)
Buildings and structures completed in 1929
Downtown Seattle
National Register of Historic Places in Seattle